Daniel Meyer is the name of:

Sportsmen
Dan Meyer (first baseman) (born 1952), baseball utility player
Dan Meyer (pitcher) (born 1981), baseball pitcher
Danny Meyer (footballer) (born 1986), Australian rules footballer for the Port Adelaide Football Club
Daniel Meyer (coach) (born 1979), German football manager
Daniel Meyer (curler) (born 1955), Swiss wheelchair curler, 2010 Winter Paralympian

Others
Daniel Meyer (engineer) (1932–1998), founder and president Southwest Technical Products Corporation
Dan Meyer (Wisconsin politician) (born 1949), Wisconsin Secretary of Natural Resources and former state assemblyman
Daniel Meyer (conductor), American conductor and musical director
Dan Meyer (entertainer) (born 1957), American sword swallower, America's Got Talent contestant and Ig Nobel Prize winner
Danny Meyer (born 1958), New York City restaurateur
Daniel P. Meyer (born 1965), federal supervisory investigator specializing in protection of whistleblowers
Dan Meyer, White House Assistant to the President for Legislative Affairs

See also
Daniel Mayer (1909–1996), French politician
Daniel Mayr (born 1995), German professional basketball player